Orthochromis machadoi, the Cunene dwarf happy, is a species of cichlid native to Angola and Namibia, where it is known from the Cunene River system.  This species can reach a length of  SL. The specific name of this fish honours the Portuguese zoologist António de Barros Machado (1912-2002) who collected the type in Angola.

References

External links 

Cichlid fish of Africa
Freshwater fish of Angola
Freshwater fish of Namibia
machadoi
Fish described in 1967